Nichromite  is a black cubic metallic mineral and member of the spinel group.  Nichromite was originally reported from the Bon Accord nickel deposit in Barberton District, South Africa.  Occurring naturally in a nickel deposit, nichromite is named for chromite with dominant nickel. 

The atomic arrangement of the spinel group is a commonly studied structure and characteristically has four closely packed oxygen atoms.  The nickel atoms are organized corresponding to a "normal" spinel arrangement.  

The mineral has only been found in the Bon Accord Nickel Deposit in South Africa where it is formed by replacing chromite and rimmed by trevorite.

References

Spinel group
Cubic minerals
Minerals in space group 227